The 1976–77 Liga Leumit season saw Maccabi Tel Aviv win the title, with striker Vicky Peretz ending as the league's top scorer with 17 goals.

Three clubs, Hapoel Kfar Saba, Maccabi Haifa and Maccabi Petah Tikva, were relegated as the league was reduced to 14 clubs for the following season. Hapoel Be'er Sheva finished one place above the relegation zone a year after winning the title.

Final table

Results

References
Israel - List of final tables RSSSF

Liga Leumit seasons
Israel
1976–77 in Israeli football leagues